Kedestes rogersi is a butterfly in the family Hesperiidae. It is found in southern Sudan, Uganda, Kenya and northern Tanzania. The habitat consists of dry thornbush and Acacia country.

References

Butterflies described in 1907
r